Pinus maximartinezii, called Martinez pinyon, big-cone pinyon or maxipiñon, is a pine in the pinyon pine group, native to west-central Mexico.

Description
The bark is brown, thick and fissured at the base of the trunk. The scales are unusual for a pine in the soft pine group (Pinus subgenus Strobus); most pines in that group have flexible scales. The cones open to  broad when mature.

It differs from all other pinyon species in that it has very massive cones and large seeds. Like other pinyons, the seeds are edible; this represents a threat to the species' survival, as the majority of the seeds produced are harvested, limiting natural regeneration of the pines.

Range and habitat
The range is highly localised, confined to two small areas of the southern Sierra Madre Occidental – the Sierra de Morones in southern Zacatecas, and La Muralla in Durango. It occurs at moderate altitudes, from 1800–2400 m and 21° North latitude, in warm and temperate, dry climate conditions.

The Mexican government has declared this species endangered.

Discovery
Because of its isolation in a remote area, it escaped discovery until 1964, when the Mexican botanist Jerzy Rzedowski noticed some unusually large pine nuts (piñones) sold in the markets of local villages, and investigated the area to find their source.

Cultivation
It has started being cultivated recently and is a very attractive ornamental tree.

References

External links
Gymnosperm Database: Pinus maximartinezii
Farjon, A. & Styles, B. T. (1997). Pinus (Pinaceae). Flora Neotropica Monograph 75: 221–224.
 Conifers Around the World: Pinus maximartinezii – Martínez Pinyon Pine.

maximartinezii
Edible nuts and seeds
Endangered plants
Endemic flora of Mexico
Flora of the Sierra Madre Occidental